The Punishment Committee (Persian: کمیته مجازات) was a secret organization existing in the last years of the reign of Qajar dynasty in Iran. The organization's goal was to assassinate people who they considered to be traitors and foreign agents.

The committee was dissolved in 13 July 1917, after its members were arrested and punished.

History 
Founded on 1 September 1916, the organizations original founders were three people named Ebrahim Monshizadeh,  and Mohammad Nazar Khan Mashkut al-Mamalek.

The first target of the organization was the head of Tehran's granary, named Mirza Esmail Khan, whose relations with the British and possible sale of grain to the British and Russian forces incurred the wrath of the committee.

Other people assassinated by the organizations were:

 , former parliament member and treasurer, 22 May 1917
 , former parliament member, 7 June 1917.
 Montakheb ad-Dowleh, treasurer, 8 June 1917
 Mirza Ahmad Khan Ostovar
 Ahmad Khan Safa
 Sardar Rashid

Members 

 Ebrahim Monshizadeh
 
 Mohammad Nazar Khan Mashkut al-Mamalek
 
 Emad al-Kottab
 
 
 Hossein Khan Allah
 Ali Akbar Ardaghi
 Ehsanollah Khan Dustdar
 Seyyed Morteza
 Mirza Abdolhossein Sa'atsaz
 Bahador as-Saltaneh
 Akbar Khan

In popular culture 
The committee was featured in the popular Iranian series Hezar Dastan.

References 

Persian Constitutional Revolution
1916 establishments in Iran